Typhoon Pat, known in the Philippines as Typhoon Luming, was a powerful typhoon that struck Japan during the summer of 1985. Pat is also one of three storms in the Western Pacific which interacted with each other. Originating from a monsoon trough towards the end of August, Pat first formed on August 24 several hundred miles east of the Philippines. It gradually intensified, and two days later, Pat was upgraded into a tropical storm. The cyclone initially moved east-northeast while continuing to deepen. However, Pat leveled off in intensity on August 27. After turning northwest, Pat attained typhoon intensity on August 28. The next day, the storm crossed the southern Japanese islands and entered the Sea of Japan. Gradually weakening, Pat transitioned into an extratropical cyclone later on August 31. Early the next day, the storm moved ashore along northeastern Japan. The system dissipated on September 2 after reentering the Pacific Ocean. A total of 23 perished due to Typhoon Pat and 12 others were rendered as missing. Additionally, 79 people were injured. Furthermore, 38 houses in Japan were demolished, 110 were damaged, and over 2,000 were flooded. More than 160,000 homes lost power. A total of 165 flights were cancelled.

Meteorological history

Typhoon Pat originated from an active monsoon trough located east of the Philippines in the last two weeks of August. Forming around the time as Typhoon Odessa and Tropical Storm Ruby, an area of enhanced convection was first noted towards the end of August. At 0600 UTC on August 24, the Japan Meteorological Agency (JMA) started watching the system. Fifteen hours later, the Joint Typhoon Warning Center (JTWC) followed suit. At this time, the system was located within a favorable environment. The JTWC issued a Tropical Cyclone Formation Alert (TCFA) on the afternoon of August 25. Early the next day, the JMA upgraded the disturbance into Tropical Storm Pat. That afternoon, the TCFA was re-issued. Following additional Hurricane Hunter reports, which noted evidence of a surface circulation, the JTWC declared the system Tropical Storm Pat.

Initially poorly organized, Pat headed east-northeast, south of a subtropical ridge. Meanwhile, the JTWC anticipated the storm to move east-northeast and separate from the monsoon trough before turning west-northwest under a weakening ridge. Instead, Pat drifted northeast, but remained situated within the monsoon trough. As such, the JTWC revised their forecast, and now expected the storm to move northwest due to the presence of an eastward moving trough situated over Mongolia. Meanwhile, the JMA increased the intensity of Pat to  early on August 28. Several hours later, both the JTWC and the JMA upgraded Pat to a typhoon. According to the JMA, the storm leveled off intensity for about a day. By midday on August 29, some tropical cyclone forecast models began to show Pat emerging into the Sea of Japan west of the ridge. However, this theory was not supported by the JTWC as they believed that the ridge was too narrow to be picked up a trough. The next day, the agency finally revised its forecast and predicted the storm to enter the sea. By this time, the ridge was gone, though a trough was now located near South Korea.

Shortly after its peak, Pat moved ashore along the southern tip Kyushu on August 31. Overland, Pat began to weaken, and early the next day, the JMA downgraded Pat to a severe tropical storm. As Odessa moved east-northeast, Pat accelerated towards the north, and then emerged into the Sea of Japan later on August 31. That evening, the JTWC downgraded Pat into a tropical storm. At 2100 UTC that day, the JTWC noted that Pat had transitioned into an extratropical cyclone. By this time, all the convection activity was restricted to the northeast quadrant of the system. Early on September 1, Pat made landfall in Hokkaido along northeastern Japan. At midday, the JTWC stopped watching the system, although the JMA continued to do so until 1800 UTC on September 2.

Preparations, impact and aftermath
Pat was responsible for strong winds, including a  wind speed in Yakushima. The island of Kyushu sustained the worst affects from the typhoon. Twenty-three people were killed by the typhoon while 12 others were listed as missing. A 61-year-old man who died when knocked over by a street sign in Izumi. A 35-year-old woman was crushed to death in Kagoshima when her home was demolished. A total of 179 people were injured due to Pat, including 23 on Honshu and 156 on Kyushu. In Aomori, a tent fell on 400 people attending a sporting event, injuring 18. In the nearby Yamagata prefecture, a signboard at a school ground fell due to strong winds, injuring four students. Nearby, in the Kumamoto prefecture, one man was struck and killed by a flying tin plate, another was swept out to sea, and a man died when a ladder fell on him. Elsewhere, twelve fisherman perished at sea, seven of whom were not confirmed dead until September 2.

A total of 38 houses in Japan were destroyed, 110 were damaged, and more than 2,000 were flooded. Landslides were observed at 56 locations. Power was lost to 160,000 families. A total of 165 flights were cancelled, delaying 15,000 passengers. A total of 160 trains were cancelled. Two bullet train lines experienced delays in Kyushu; ferry and air service were also delayed there. Offshore, ten fishing boats sunk, including one Japanese cargo ship. An additional 12 ships were rendered as missing. Ninety-five other boats took refuge in North Korea, though 59 left on September 2 to return to Japan.

See also

 List of tropical cyclones
 Typhoon Bess (1982)
 Typhoon Forrest (1983)
 Typhoon Namtheun (2016)

Notes

References

1985 in Japan
1985 Pacific typhoon season
Typhoons in Japan
Typhoons
Pat